Des English (born 22 January 1956) is a former Australian rules footballer who played with Carlton in the Victorian Football League (VFL) during the 1980s. Regarded as a tireless and absolutely reliable team player and defender, English played in the Carlton premiership sides of 1981 and 1982. He was diagnosed with leukemia in 1986 and never played again although he eventually recovered.

Carlton's emphatic return win against Hawthorn in the 1987 Grand Final, played out in record breaking September heat was largely attributed inspirationally and motivationally by the Carlton players to the real-life battles of teammates English, after his cancer diagnosis and Peter Motley, after a career-ending car accident. This moment in 1987 is notable for Peter Dean's words spoken on the dais at the game's end: 'Motts..... Dessie...... you're f--king bloody beautiful!!' The episode is something of a legend in Carlton history, inspiring future generations in similar situations.

References

External links

1956 births
Living people
Carlton Football Club players
Carlton Football Club Premiership players
Eaglehawk Football Club players
Australian rules footballers from Victoria (Australia)
Victorian State of Origin players
Two-time VFL/AFL Premiership players